William Wirtz may refer to:

W. Willard Wirtz (1912–2010), U.S. administrator, cabinet officer, attorney and law professor
Bill Wirtz (1929–2007), chief executive officer of the family-owned Wirtz Corporation
William Wirtz (American football) (1887–1965), American football, basketball, and baseball coach

See also
Bill Wertz (born 1967), American former Major League Baseball player
Bill Wurtz, American singer-songwriter, multi-instrumentalist and online video creator